Aleksei Aleksandrovich Alemanov (born 10 October 1977) is a former Russian professional football player.

Club career
He played in the Russian Football National League for FC Tekstilshchik-Telekom Ivanovo in 2007.

References

External links
 

1977 births
Living people
Russian footballers
Association football midfielders
FC Lokomotiv Moscow players
FC Spartak Kostroma players
FC Tekstilshchik Ivanovo players